Veli Selim Saarinen (16 September 1902 – 12 October 1969) was a Finnish cross-country skier who competed in the 1928 and 1932 Olympics.

In 1928 he finished fourth in the 18 km event. Four years later he won a gold in the 50 km and a bronze in the 18 km event, becoming the first Finnish cross-country skier to win an Olympic gold medal. Yet his biggest success came at the FIS Nordic World Ski Championships, where he won six medals between 1926 and 1934, including three gold medals.

Domestically Saarinen won only two titles, over 50 km in 1930–31. In 1934 he retired from competitions and later coached the German (1934–1937) and Finnish (1937–1968) national cross-country skiing teams. In 1947–1968 he also served as a chief executive of the Finnish Skiing Federation.

Cross-country skiing results
All results are sourced from the International Ski Federation (FIS).

Olympic Games
 2 medals – (1 gold, 1 bronze)

World Championships
 6 medals – (3 gold, 2 silver, 1 bronze)

References

External links

 

1902 births
1969 deaths
People from Vyborg District
People from Viipuri Province (Grand Duchy of Finland)
Finnish male cross-country skiers
Olympic cross-country skiers of Finland
Cross-country skiers at the 1928 Winter Olympics
Cross-country skiers at the 1932 Winter Olympics
Olympic gold medalists for Finland
Olympic bronze medalists for Finland
Olympic medalists in cross-country skiing
FIS Nordic World Ski Championships medalists in cross-country skiing
Medalists at the 1932 Winter Olympics
People from Virolahti
Sportspeople from Kymenlaakso